The Hikutaia River is a river of New Zealand's North Island. It has its source in several streams which flow west from the Coromandel Range, the longest of which is the Waipaheke Stream.

Water quality is good, except for ecoli and ammoniacal nitrogen.

See also
List of rivers of New Zealand

References

External links

Thames-Coromandel District
Rivers of Waikato
Rivers of New Zealand
Hauraki Gulf catchment